Universal Hospitals Group is one of Turkey's largest hospital groups. In 2013 it has 11 hospitals in 7 cities in Turkey, and is planning expansion outside Turkey to reach 25 hospitals and 4000 beds by the end of 2013, using investment from ADM Capital, and the International Finance Corporation. The Group owns the Taksim German Hospital since 1992.

References

External links
 

Health care companies of Turkey
1972 establishments in Turkey
Health care companies established in 1972
Turkish brands